A linga, or lingam, is a symbol of the Hindu deity Shiva.

Linga may also refer to:

People
 Praveen Linga (born 1979), Indian chemical engineer

Places
 Linga, Victoria, Australia
 Linga, Madhya Pradesh, India
 List of islands called Linga, in Scotland

Other uses
 Linga language, a language of the Democratic Republic of the Congo
 Linga (cookie), a sesame seed cookie from the Philippines
 Linga (spider), a genus of spiders
 , a Latvian Navy ship

See also

 Linga Sound (disambiguation)
 Lingaa, a 2014 Indian Tamil-language action drama film 
 Lingga (disambiguation)
 Lingua (disambiguation)
 Lingas (disambiguation)
 Ling (disambiguation)